2 Feet in the Gutter is the final album led by jazz drummer Dave Bailey which was originally released on the Epic label in 1961. The album features the first recording of "Comin' Home Baby" which became a top 40 hit for Mel Tormé.

Reception

AllMusic reviewer Ken Dryden stated: "While this record is just a notch beneath Dave Bailey's earlier dates for Epic -- One Foot in the Gutter and Gettin' Into Somethin' -- it is definitely worth picking up".

Track listing 
 "Comin' Home Baby" (Ben Tucker) - 5:39   
 "Two Feet in the Gutter" (Rudy Stevenson) - 7:59   
 "Shiny Stockings" (Frank Foster) - 7:54   
 "Lady Iris B" (Stevenson) - 6:08   
 "Coffee Walk" (Tucker) - 9:05

Personnel 
 Dave Bailey - drum kit
 Bill Hardman - trumpet
 Frank Haynes - tenor saxophone
 Billy Gardner - piano
 Ben Tucker - double bass

References 

Dave Bailey (musician) albums
1961 albums
Epic Records albums